Dimitris Kalaitzidis (alternate spelling: Dimitrios) (born February 15, 1985) is a Greek professional basketball player for Gefyra of the Greek 3rd division. He is a 6'6' (1.98 m) tall shooting guard–small forward.

Professional career
Some of the clubs that Kalaitzidis has played with during his pro career include: Iraklis Thessaloniki, Olympiacos, Panellinios, APOEL. In the summer of 2012 Kalaitzidis signed for Greek Basket League Team KAOD. He joined Kavala in the summer of 2013.

On 23 July 2016, Kalaitzidis signed a contract with Iraklis Thessaloniki of the Greek A2, returning in the team after 11 years.

On 23 September 2020, he signed with Aris Thessaloniki of the Greek Basket League. On 26 July 2021, Kalaitzidis signed with Gefyra, opting for the first time in his career to play in the 3rd division.

National team career
Kalaitzidis was a member of the junior national teams of Greece. With Greece's junior national teams, he played at the 2004 FIBA Europe Under-20 Championship, and the 2005 FIBA Europe Under-20 Championship

Personal life
Kalaitzidis was raised in Pefka, and he has a degree in Civil Engineering.

References

External links
FIBA Profile
Euroleague.net Profile
Eurobasket.com Profile
Basketball-reference.com Profile
Hellenic Federation Profile 

1985 births
Living people
APOEL B.C. players
Aris B.C. players
Competitors at the 2009 Mediterranean Games
Iraklis Thessaloniki B.C. players
Greek men's basketball players
Greek Basket League players
Mediterranean Games medalists in basketball
Mediterranean Games silver medalists for Greece
Olympiacos B.C. players
P.A.O.K. BC players
Point guards
Shooting guards
Small forwards
Basketball players from Thessaloniki